"I Got You" is a song recorded by American singer Bebe Rexha. It was released on October 28, 2016, as the lead single from her second extended play (EP) All Your Fault: Pt. 1 and was later included on her debut studio album Expectations (2018). The track was produced by production team Captain Cuts. It was also featured in a commercial for the Galaxy S21 FE.

Composition
"I Got You" is a pop and tropical house song written in the key of A minor in common time with a tempo of 98 beats per minute. Most of the song follows a chord progression of Am-C-F-G-Am. The bridge follows a sequence of F-C-G-F-C-G-Dm-Em-F.

Music video
The video is directed by Dave Meyers. Rexha filmed a music video for the song, but it was scrapped due to its explicit content. She told a radio DJ, "It was actually too sexual so I had to get rid of it. It was too much," explaining further, "I have young fans. I like to be sexy 'cause I'm a woman now, but I still want to be a good role model." Rexha later filmed another version for the song in a desert setting. The music video directed by Dave Meyers debuted on January 6, 2017 on Rexha's YouTube account and has since reached over 300 million views. The outfits she wore in the music video were compared to those of Kylie Jenner by Billboard.

Live performances
The singer performed the song for the first time at the MTV Europe Music Awards on November 6, 2016. On January 13, 2017, she performed "I Got You" on Good Morning America along with her previous single "In the Name of Love". On January 16, 2017, she performed "I Got You" on The Tonight Show Starring Jimmy Fallon, on February 16, 2017 on Late Night with Seth Meyers, on February 17, 2017 on Live with Kelly and on February 22, 2017 along with the song "Say My Name" originally by Destiny's Child on The Late Late Show with James Corden.

Track listing

Digital download
 "I Got You" – 3:11

Digital download (Cheat Codes remix)
 "I Got You" (Cheat Codes remix) – 3:19

Digital download (acoustic version)
 "I Got You" (acoustic version) – 3:12

Digital download (Remixes EP)
 "I Got You" (Cheat Codes Remix) – 3:19
 "I Got You" (Party Pupils Remix) – 3:11
 "I Got You" (SNBRN Remix) – 3:18
 "I Got You" (The White Panda Remix) – 3:09

Charts

Weekly charts

Year-end charts

Certifications

Release history

See also
List of number-one dance singles of 2017 (U.S.)

References

External links
 

2016 songs
2016 singles
Bebe Rexha songs
Songs written by Bebe Rexha
Songs written by Lauren Christy
Warner Records singles
Songs written by Jacob Kasher
Songs written by Ryan Rabin
Songs written by Ben Berger
Songs written by Ryan McMahon (record producer)
Song recordings produced by Captain Cuts